Crosby is an English, Scottish, and Irish surname. Notable people with the surname include:

 Alfred W. Crosby (1931–2018), American historian
 Andrew Crosby, Canadian rower
 Andy Crosby, English footballer
 Bing Crosby, American entertainer
 Members of his family:
 Bob Crosby, brother, American bandleader and singer
 Chris Crosby (singer), nephew
 Denise Crosby, granddaughter, American actress
 Dennis Crosby, son, American actor
 Gary Crosby (actor), son, American singer and actor
 Harry Crosby (businessman), son, American actor, singer and investment banker
 Kathryn Crosby, second wife, American actress
 Larry Crosby, brother and his long-time publicity director
 Lindsay Crosby, son, American actor and singer
 Mary Crosby, daughter, American actress
 Nathaniel Crosby, son, American golfer
 Phillip Crosby, son, American actor and singer
 Bobby Crosby, American baseball player
 Bridgette Crosby, fictional character in the DC Universe
 Bubba Crosby, American baseball player
 Cathy Lee Crosby, American actress
 Charles A. Crosby, former mayor of the town of Yarmouth, Nova Scotia, Canada
 Charles F. Crosby, American politician
 Charles N. Crosby, U.S. Congressman from Pennsylvania
 Charlotte Crosby (born 1990), English television personality
 Chris Crosby (webcomics), American cartoonist, writer, co-founder of Keenspot
 Clarkson F. Crosby (1817–1858), New York politician
 Cornilia Thurza Crosby, American outdoorsman and the first Registered Maine Guide
 Darius Crosby (c. 1768  1818), New York politician
 David Crosby (1941–2023), American singer-songwriter 
 Dom Crosby (born 1990), British rugby league footballer
 Don Crosby, Australian actor
 Ed Crosby, American baseball player
 Edward W. Crosby, African-American educator
 Emma Crosby, English newsreader
 Ernest Howard Crosby, American reformer and author
 Fanny Crosby, American lyricist
 Faye Crosby, American psychologist
 Floyd Crosby, American cinematographer
 Frederick Gordon Crosby, English automotive artist
 Gary Crosby (bassist), English jazz musician
 Harrison Woodhull Crosby, American businessman
 Harry Crosby, American heir and bon vivant
 Howard Crosby (minister), American preacher and teacher
 Howard Edward Crosby, Canadian politician
 Hugh Powell Crosby, Canadian politician
 James Crosby (banker) (born 1956), English banker
 James V. Crosby (born 1952), American prison officer
 Jim Crosby (1873–1960), South African rugby union player
 Joan Crosby, English table tennis player
 John Crosby (conductor) (1926–2002), American founding director of the Santa Fe Opera, 1957 to 2000
 John Crosby (media critic), American media critic for the New York Herald Tribune
 John C. Crosby (1859–1943), American politician
 John S. Crosby (general) (born 1932), American lieutenant general
 Jon Crosby, American musician
Juliette Crosby (1895 – 1969), American actress
 Ken Crosby, Canadian baseball player
 Kim Crosby, American racecar driver
 Kim Crosby (singer), American singer and actress
 LaVon Crosby, American politician
 Lorraine Crosby, English singer
 Lynton Crosby, Australian political campaign strategist
 Malcolm Crosby, English former footballer and manager
 Mason Crosby, American football placekicker
 Matthew Crosby, English comedian
 Maxx Crosby, American football player
 Nathaniel Crosby, American golfer
 Norm Crosby (1927–2020), American comedian
 Patrick Crosby, professional indoor lacrosse goalie
 Paul Crosby (disambiguation)
 Peirce Crosby, admiral in the United States Navy
 Philip B. Crosby, American businessman and author known for zero-defects quality management theory
 Robbin Crosby, American rock guitarist
 Robert B. Crosby, American Republican politician
 Ron Crosby, American football player
 Sidney Crosby, Canadian ice hockey player
 Stephen Crosby (18081869), American politician
 Steve Crosby (born 1950), American football coach and player
 Thomas Crosby (1840–1914), English missionary in Canada
 Thomas Crosby (Baptist) (1683–1751), English writer
 Thomas F. Crosby Jr. (1940–2004), American judge
 Tom Crosby Jr. (1928–2011), American politician
 Tyrell Crosby, American football player
 William Crosby Dawson, American lawyer, judge, politician and soldier from Georgia
 William Holmes Crosby Jr., American physicist, hematologist, inventor and translator

See also
 Crosbie

Anglicised Irish-language surnames
English-language surnames
Lists of people by surname
Scottish surnames
Surnames of English origin